Laura Secor is an American journalist whose work has focused on Iranian politics and Iran–United States relations. She has written about personal stories, such as the experience of poet Asieh Amini, and has also written a book, Children of Paradise: The Struggle for the Soul of Iran.

Education and career
Secor earned an B.A. in philosophy at Brown University before beginning to cover Iran. After visiting Iran in 2004 she was struck by the vocal dissent there of the people against their government. She began to write about the reform movement there and individuals struggling for change. She also writes about the Iranian diaspora in the US and has documented the case of Sirous Asgari.

References

Living people
Year of birth missing (living people)
21st-century American journalists
21st-century American women writers
American women journalists
Brown University alumni
The New Yorker people
Political journalists